Kamal Kapoor (22 February 1920 – 2 August 2010) was an Indian actor and producer who acted in around 600 Hindi, Punjabi and Gujarati films.

Early and personal life
Kamal Kapoor was born in 1920 in Peshawar, North-West Frontier Province, British India. Kapoor completed his studies in Lahore's DAV college. He was cousin of Prithviraj Kapoor and maternal grandfather of Goldie Behl. 

Kapoor was a first cousin of actor Prithviraj Kapoor (their mothers were sisters). He had five children - three sons and two daughters. His younger daughter is the wife of film-maker Ramesh Behl and mother of Goldie Behl. His son Kapil Kapoor is a scholar and writer on Indian intellectual traditions.

Career
He started his career working as a hero through the 1940s-50s. His first film was Door Chalen, which was released in 1946 . He played the lead in the movie Door Chalen. He started playing a villain in the 1960s-70s. Some of his popular roles are those of the father of Raj Kapoor in Aag and Narang in Don.

Selected filmography

References

External links

1920 births
2010 deaths
Indian male film actors
Kapoor family